Akamaru is the third largest island in the Gambier Islands of French Polynesia.

The first European to arrive was the navigator James Wilson in 1797.  In 1834, the French missionary Honoré Laval celebrated the first Mass on the island.  The church of Notre-Dame de la Paix was built between 1835 and 1862.  People from Mangareva sometimes visit to maintain the church and pick oranges in season. According to the 2012 census, there are 22 inhabitants.

The much smaller island of Mekiro is located just off (about 100 m) Akamaru's northwestern shore.

Gallery

References

Islands of the Gambier Islands